Mary Mills Coxe House is a historic home located near Hendersonville, Henderson County, North Carolina. Built about 1911, the house is a -story, Colonial Revival style frame dwelling with a pebbledash finish.  It has a two-level side-gabled roof, a pedimented front dormer, and a rear gable ell.  It features a one-story hip-roofed wraparound porch and porte-cochère.  Also on the property is a non-contributing art studio building associated with the Flat Rock School of Art.  In 1993 and 1994, the house was renovated for use as offices.

It was listed on the National Register of Historic Places in 1994.

References

Houses on the National Register of Historic Places in North Carolina
Colonial Revival architecture in North Carolina
Houses completed in 1911
Houses in Henderson County, North Carolina
National Register of Historic Places in Henderson County, North Carolina
Hendersonville, North Carolina